Thysanoplusia is a genus of moths of the family Noctuidae described by Taira Ichinosé in 1973.

Species

 Thysanoplusia ablusa Felder, 1874
 Thysanoplusia acosmia Dufay, 1972
 Thysanoplusia anargyra Guenée, 1852
 Thysanoplusia angulum Guenée, 1852
 Thysanoplusia asapheia Dufay, 1977
 Thysanoplusia aspila Dufay, 1972
 Thysanoplusia aureopicta Ronkay & Behounek, 1996
 Thysanoplusia bipartita Snellen, 1880
 Thysanoplusia brechlini Ronkay & Behounek, 1999
 Thysanoplusia capnista Dufay, 1972
 Thysanoplusia cernyi Ronkay & Behounek, 1999
 Thysanoplusia chalcedona Hampson, 1902
 Thysanoplusia circumscripta Freyer, 1831
 Thysanoplusia clarci Hampson, 1910
 Thysanoplusia cupreomicans (Hampson, 1909)
 Thysanoplusia daubei Boisduval, 1840
 Thysanoplusia distalagma Hampson, 1913
 Thysanoplusia dolera Dufay, 1977
 Thysanoplusia eikeikei Bethune-Baker, 1906
 Thysanoplusia eutheia Dufay, 1972
 Thysanoplusia exquisita Felder, 1874
 Thysanoplusia flavirosea Dufay, 1972
 Thysanoplusia florina Guenée, 1852
 Thysanoplusia hemichalcea Hampson, 1913
 Thysanoplusia homoia Dufay, 1968
 Thysanoplusia ignescens Dufay, 1968
 Thysanoplusia ignicollis Dufay, 1968
 Thysanoplusia indicator Walker, [1858]
 Thysanoplusia intermixta Warren, 1913
 Thysanoplusia jonesi Ronkay & Behounek, 1996
 Thysanoplusia laportei Dufay, 1972
 Thysanoplusia mulunga Dufay, 1972
 Thysanoplusia nyei Dufay, 1972
 Thysanoplusia orichalcea Fabricius, 1775 - slender burnished brass
 Thysanoplusia rectilinea Wallengren, 1856
 Thysanoplusia reticulata Moore, 1882
 Thysanoplusia rostrata D. S. Fletcher, 1963
 Thysanoplusia semirosea Dufay, 1968
 Thysanoplusia sestertia (Felder & Rogenhofer, 1874)
 Thysanoplusia spoliata Walker, [1858]
 Thysanoplusia tetrastigma (Hampson, 1910)
 Thysanoplusia turlini Dufay, 1978
 Thysanoplusia viettei Dufay, 1968
 Thysanoplusia violascens Hampson, 1913

References

External links
 

Plusiinae